The Marshal Ney class was a class of monitor built for the Royal Navy during the First World War.

Design and development
The need for monitors for shelling enemy positions from the English Channel had become apparent only at the start of the war and they were designed with some haste. The design of monitors had been given by the Director of Naval Construction, Eustace Tennyson d'Eyncourt, to an Assistant Constructor, Charles S. Lillicrap (later himself to become Director). By the time the Marshal Neys came about some 33 monitors of various sorts had already been ordered. The redesign of the battlecruisers  and  meant that there were now two modern 15-inch turrets available. The First Sea Lord Lord Fisher and Winston Churchill, First Lord of the Admiralty decided these should be used for two more monitors, initially M 13 and M 14, but then renamed after the French Napoleonic War marshals Nicolas Jean de Dieu Soult and Michel Ney.

For machinery the two monitors received diesel engines, which were then a novelty – the majority of ships being steam powered. The use of diesels meant that they had no need of boiler rooms which went well with a low draught, nor of large funnels which reduced the amount of superstructure. These engines were originally designed for much smaller freighters and therefore they proved particularly slow and unreliable.

The turret was on multi-sided barbette made of individual flat plates, cutting down on the build time. The  guns were disposed along her sides for protection from smaller vessels, the  guns being for anti-aircraft use.

Ships

 
Built by Palmers, Newcastle
Launched June 1915
Completed August 1915
Served with the Dover Monitor Squadron, after the war became a gunnery training ship. At the start of World War II she was considered for recommissioning but instead her turret was removed for a new monitor, and she became a headquarters ship. She was paid off and scrapped in 1946
 
Built by Palmers, Newcastle
Launched August 1915
Completed November 1915
She later acted as a depot ship gaining onshore buildings, and was renamed Alaunia II and was only finally scrapped in 1957

References

Bibliography

  Vol. 1 • Vol. 2

Dittmar, F. J. & Colledge, J. J., "British Warships 1914-1919", (Ian Allan, London, 1972), 

 
Gray, Randal (ed), "Conway's All the World's Fighting Ships 1906–1921", (Conway Maritime Press, London, 1985), 

Monitor classes
 
Ship classes of the Royal Navy